Église Saint-Étienne de Rosheim is a church in Rosheim, Bas-Rhin, Alsace, France. Originally built in the 13th century, it was last built in 1788. It became a registered Monument historique in 1990.

References

Churches in Bas-Rhin
Monuments historiques of Bas-Rhin
Churches completed in 1788
1788 establishments in France